Starksia langi, the Lang's blenny, is a species of labrisomid blenny native to the Caribbean coast of Central America, found in Belize, Honduras, and Panama. It is found in shallow waters of usually  or less.  This species reach a length of  SL. It is named after Michael A. Lang, Director of the Smithsonian Marine Science Network and Smithsonian Science Diving Program. It is a prey of the lionfish.

References

langi
Fish described in 2011